Kim Geon-won is a South Korean actor and model. He is best known for his lead roles in dramas such as Ending Again and Ending Again Special.

Filmography

Television series

References

External links 
 
 

Year of birth missing (living people)
Living people
21st-century South Korean male actors
South Korean male models
South Korean male television actors